Just Ask for Diamond, alternatively titled Diamond's Edge, is a 1988 British comedy crime film directed by Stephen Bayly and starring Colin Dale, Saeed Jaffrey and Dursley McLinden. It is based on The Falcon's Malteser (1986), the first book of The Diamond Brothers series written by Anthony Horowitz. A six-part television miniseries sequel, The Diamond Brothers, was broadcast on ITV in 1991, with McLinden and Dale reprising their roles.

Plot summary
A pair of brothers are paid to take care of a confectionery box, but soon come under pressure from various people seeking its contents.

Nicholas Simple (aka Nick Diamond) is more like the brains than his detective brother Herbert Timothy Simple, aka Tim Diamond, inc. Because when a dwarf enters with a secret package, nearly all the crooks in England are out to get the brothers, and just because of a confectionery package. Nick and Tim soon break their promise to the dwarf, and open the secret package. Soon they find out that the secret package actually is a box of malteasers. Belonging to an international criminal named Henry von Falkenberg, or The Falcon, a secret opening a very precious treasure belonging to the dead criminal.

Later, the dwarf is found dead, and Tim is blamed for it. Nick spends time in jail with him, and they join old chief Inspectors Snape and Boyle. Soon they are threatened by criminals, sent to jail, wanted for murder, wanted for disturbance, nearly killed, kidnapped, given concrete trainers, bullied by punk criminals and invited by women who keep crocodiles for pets. If all these criminals are after a small box of chocolates, this must mean that it is a serious mystery the two have to solve, and this should be a case for Tim Diamond, but is it just him, or his is it his kid brother's help with succession, and together will the Diamond Brothers solve a crime that is tougher than thought?

Home media
In 1989, the film was released on VHS. The UK version is thought to have been converted directly from the cinema reels although the American VHS, which was titled "Diamond's Edge" had removed substantial amount of Colin Dale's voiceover and some violent scenes. They are each 89 and 80 minutes in length, respectively. In 2002 the US VHS was converted to DVD.

Cast
 Colin Dale as Nick Simple, a.k.a. Nick Diamond
 Dursley McLinden as Herbert Timothy Simple, a.k.a. Tim Diamond
 Saeed Jaffrey as Mr. Patel
 José René Ruiz as Johnny Naples 
 Michael Robbins as "The Fat Man"
 Patricia Hodge as Betty Charlady, a.k.a. Brenda von Falkenberg 
 Jim McManus as Hammett 
 Jimmy Nail as Boyle 
 Roy Kinnear as Jack Splendide 
 Bill Paterson as Chief Inspector Snape 
 Forbes Collins as Henry von Falkenberg 
 Peter Eyre as Gott 
 Nickolas Grace as Himmell 
 Susannah York as Lauren Bacardi

Sequel

In 1991, The Diamond Brothers, a six-part television miniseries written and directed by Horowitz himself, was broadcast on ITV. While officially based on the Horowitz' book South by South East, Horowitz later claimed he wrote the novel after he had already written the scripts of the television series, effectively making South by South East a novelisation of the television series rather than the novel acting as the primary source of inspiration. Both McLinden and Dale reprised their respective film roles, which makes the television series act as a sequel to Just Ask for Diamond. However, unlike the film adaptation, the series has never been released on any home media, and it was also never rebroadcast.

References

External links
 
 
 

The Diamond Brothers
1988 films
British crime comedy films
Films shot at EMI-Elstree Studios
Films based on British novels
1980s crime comedy films
Films scored by Trevor Jones
1988 comedy films
1980s English-language films
1980s British films